Amrit Kumar Bohara, born April 27, 1948, is a leader of the Communist Party of Nepal (Unified Marxist-Leninist) (CPN-UML). He is a member of the Standing Committee of the party and was its acting General Secretary.

Bohara was released in early May 2005 along with his colleague, CPN-UML General Secretary Madhav Kumar Nepal, after being detained for several months on King Gyanendra's orders.

Bohara was the top candidate of CPN-UML in the proportional representation list for the April 2008 Constituent Assembly election. Following the election, in which the CPN-UML was defeated, Madhav Kumar Nepal resigned as General Secretary and Bohara became acting General Secretary.

See also
Politics of Nepal
History of Nepal

References

Government ministers of Nepal
Living people
Communist Party of Nepal (Unified Marxist–Leninist) politicians
Nepalese prisoners and detainees
Year of birth missing (living people)
Nepal MPs 1991–1994
Nepal MPs 1994–1999